Sir William Godolphin (1567–1613), of Godolphin in Cornwall, was an English knight, soldier, and politician who sat in the House of Commons from 1604 to 1611.

Biography
Godolphin was the older son of Sir Francis Godolphin (1540–1608), also an MP and Governor of the Scilly Isles and his first wife, Margaret Killigrew of Arwenack. He matriculated at Emmanuel College, Cambridge in 1585 and was admitted at Lincoln's Inn on 29 January 1587.

He accompanied the Earl of Essex in his military expedition of 1599–1600 to Ireland, and was knighted on 13 July 1599 for his gallantry in an action at Arklow. He was subsequently put in command of a brigade of cavalry, and he was credited with playing an important part in the victory at the Siege of Kinsale on 24 December 1601, when his troops broke through the enemy line and captured the Spanish commander. For his services, he was highly commended by the Crown, and made a member of the Privy Council of Ireland.

Godolphin was Member of Parliament (MP) for Cornwall in the first parliament of James I from 1604 to 1611, and was regarded as a reliable supporter of Crown policy.

He was Lieutenant-governor of the Scilly Isles from 1597, becoming full Governor on the death of his father in 1608 until his own death in 1613.

In August 1608, King James sent him to Scotland to report on a promising new silver mine at Hilderston near Bathgate.

Marriage
He married Thomasine, the only surviving daughter and heiress of Thomas Sidney of Wighton, Norfolk and his wife Mary Southwell of Sydmondham Hall (whose third husband was the distinguished soldier Sir Conyers Clifford) and had 3 sons and a daughter.

Death
In the summer of 1613, when he was at the height of his political influence, Godolphin became seriously ill and died in early September. He was buried at Breage, Cornwall September 5, 1613.

Family
Godolphin's children included:
 Sir Francis Godolphin, KB (1605–1667), his heir
 Sidney Godolphin (1610–1643), the poet
 William Godolphin (1611–1636), who first succeeded his father as Governor of Scilly
 Penelope Godolphin, who married Charles Berkeley, 2nd Viscount Fitzhardinge

Notes

Ancestry

References

Further reading

Godolphin family tree

1567 births
1613 deaths
Members of the pre-1707 English Parliament for constituencies in Cornwall
People of Elizabethan Ireland
English knights
People from Breage, Cornwall
William
English soldiers
16th-century English soldiers
17th-century English soldiers
English MPs 1604–1611
Alumni of Emmanuel College, Cambridge
Members of Lincoln's Inn
Members of the Privy Council of Ireland
Knights Bachelor
Governors of the Isles of Scilly